Luzula acuminata, the  hairy woodrush, is a species of perennial plant in Juncaceae family that grows in northeastern United States and Canada.

References

External links

Luzula acuminata

Flora of Eastern Canada
acuminata
Flora of the Northeastern United States
Plants described in 1840
Taxa named by Constantine Samuel Rafinesque
Flora without expected TNC conservation status